Thompson Rivers University (commonly referred to as TRU) is a public teaching and research university offering undergraduate and graduate degrees and vocational training. Its main campus is in Kamloops, British Columbia, Canada, and its name comes from the two rivers which converge in Kamloops, the North Thompson and South Thompson. The university has a satellite campus in Williams Lake, BC and a distance education division called TRU-Open Learning. It also has several international partnerships through its TRU World division. TRU is accredited by the Northwest Commission on Colleges and Universities (NWCCU) at the associate, baccalaureate and master's degree levels.

TRU offers 140 on-campus programs, including trades apprenticeships, vocational certificates and diplomas, bachelor's and master's degrees and law, and approximately 60 online or distance programs through the Open Learning division.

History
Kamloops, the largest population centre in the regions now known as the Thompson-Okanagan and Cariboo-Chilcotin, was chosen by the BC provincial government as the site for one of several new two-year regional colleges to provide academic and vocational programs outside of the largest cities of Vancouver and Victoria served by the province's three universities. The province founded Cariboo College in 1970. Classes for 367 full-time and 200 part-time students began in September, 1970, held in buildings at the Kamloops Indian Residential School for that first year.

Cariboo College offered two-year academic programs that enabled students to transfer to UBC and the recently established Simon Fraser University (SFU) and University of Victoria (UVic). The college also began vocational training programs to serve the needs of forestry, mining and other industries in the region. Cariboo's vocational division, now known as the School of Trades and Technology, was established following the move of the college to the new campus built along McGill Road in September 1971. In May 1972, BC Premier W.A.C. Bennett officially opened the vocational wing. By provincial mandate, Cariboo amalgamated with the Kamloops Vocational School in 1974, providing training for occupations in demand in Kamloops and the region.

In 1978, Cariboo College was officially designated as a college with corporate status under the British Columbia Colleges and Provincial Institutes Act, gaining its own board independent of the school boards that had previously governed it. The Act also created the Open Learning Institute (OLI), which would later become TRU Open Learning, to provide academic programs and vocational training by distance throughout the province to people who were unable to access post-secondary education due to geographic isolation or other reasons. The following year, the Universities Act gave OLI power to grant baccalaureate degrees in arts or science in its own name.

In the first 20 years, the college's population increased from 30 faculty serving 367 full-time and 200 part-time students in the first year, to 259 full-time and 124 part-time employees serving 3,047 full-time and 2,205 part-time students. As enrolment rose, Cariboo College built more than a dozen new facilities and an on-campus student housing complex, as well as renovating and expanding older buildings. In 1971, the college opened a satellite campus in Williams Lake, BC, 285 kilometres north of Kamloops, offering programs to surrounding communities, including remote Indigenous populations. In 1985, the Williams Lake campus moved to the 55,000 square-foot Hodgeson Road facility, which would later close due to seismic instability.

In 1989, Cariboo College was one of three colleges chosen by the province to become a new entity, a "university college," to provide degrees in regional centres. Cariboo's five bachelor's degrees — Arts, Science, Education, Business Administration and Nursing — were initially developed and granted under the oversight of the province's three established universities: UBC, SFU and UVic. When the first graduates received their degrees in June 1991, Cariboo was renamed the University College of the Cariboo (UCC).

In January 1995, the College and Institute Amendment Act gave UCC the authority to independently grant degrees. Several new programs launched in the decade that followed, including five more bachelor's degrees and the Adventure Guide Diploma. Construction in the 1990s included a cost-recovery-based joint proposal between UCC and the student society to complete the 53,000 square-foot, student-focused Campus Activity Centre, after a change in provincial legislation in 1990 allowed the college to borrow money privately for development.

UCC began to offer master's degree programs in collaboration with UBC and SFU in 2002, then gained the authority to grant applied master's degrees autonomously in 2003. The following year, the BC government announced UCC would become the province's newest university.

In March 2005, Thompson Rivers University (TRU) was incorporated under the Thompson Rivers University Act. The Act amalgamated the University College of the Cariboo with the BC Open University and other aspects of the Open Learning Agency, converting UCC's university council into a senate and creating a planning council for Open Learning. UCC President Dr. Roger Barnsley continued at the helm of the new institution. The province designated TRU as a special-purpose university that would continue to offer undergraduate and master's degrees, vocational training and adult basic education, undertake research and scholarly activities and, with the addition of Open Learning programs and courses, would provide an open learning educational credit bank for students.

TRU's inaugural convocation was held March 31, 2005, along with the installation of its first chancellor, Nancy Greene Raine. Prime Minister Paul Martin was TRU's first official visitor the following day. The Master of Business Administration, TRU's first autonomous master's degree program, began that September.

The 11-storey TRU Residence and Conference Centre building, a 580-room apartment-style student residence, opened in 2006. In 2007, the Williams Lake campus opened on Western Avenue. All Open Learning operations (TRU-OL) relocated from Burnaby to the new BC Centre for Open Learning building on the Kamloops campus.

Dr. Kathleen Scherf was installed as TRU's second president in 2008, but was dismissed by TRU's board of governors in 2009. Roger Barnsley returned to serve two more years as president during the search for Scherf's replacement. Dr. Alan Shaver was installed as TRU's third president in 2011, and the Honourable Wally Oppal was installed as chancellor. Dr. Brett Fairbairn started as TRU's fourth president on Dec. 1, 2018, with installation taking place at convocation in June 2019.

The university became a member of the Research Universities Council of BC (RUCBC) in 2011. The Brown Family House of Learning, TRU's first LEED Gold-certified building, opened in 2011 and was the initial home of TRU Faculty of Law, the first new law school to open in Canada in over 30 years. TRU Law moved into a 44,000-square-foot space in the newly renovated Old Main building in December 2013. Law's first graduating class convocated in June 2014.

By 2017, the university agreed to lease space for a private high school intended to teach Mainland Chinese citizens intending to enter Western university systems.

In the 2021-22 academic year, TRU had a total headcount* of 27,701 students, of whom 13,638 were on campus. Due to the fact that some students are dually enrolled in on-campus and Open Learning courses, the total headcount gives the unique total for the entire institution, not a sum of on-campus and Open Learning students. International students made up 20 per cent of TRU's on-campus student population, with China, India and Saudi Arabia topping the list of 113 countries of origin. Indigenous students made up 10.5 per cent of the student body. Open Learning students totalled 15,818 students.

Campuses 

TRU's 250-acre main campus in Kamloops is situated on McGill Road in the city's southwest Sahali area, overlooking the junction of the North and South Thompson rivers from which the university takes its name. The campus has 40 acres of gardens and the largest arboretum in BC's Interior. Residences provide on-campus housing for 1,472 students. Kamloops, a city of about 100,000 people, is located in the semi-arid grasslands of the Thompson-Nicola region of British Columbia's southwestern Interior, on the traditional lands of the Secwépemc (Shuswap) people. TRU has a satellite campus in Williams Lake in BC's Cariboo-Chilcotin region, and regional centres in 100 Mile House, Clearwater, Barriere, Ashcroft, and Lillooet. The Open Learning division reaches students worldwide.

Campus development 
After one year operating out of the school district's various facilities, such as the Kamloops Indian Residential School property, Cariboo College moved to the current campus on McGill Road in September 1971, sharing the newly constructed Main building with the Kamloops Vocational School. Much of the campus had been part of a Canadian Navy munitions base and several of the officers' quarters were put to use and remain as heritage buildings on today's campus.

Construction was a constant on Cariboo College's campus to meet the needs of a rapidly expanding student body. The Library and Gymnasium opened in fall of 1976. The Science building was completed in 1980 and the Visual Arts building opened the following year. Construction began on student residences in 1988 and Hillside Stadium opened. The next year saw the completion of the Clock Tower building and Alumni Theatre, and the addition of a second storey on the Main building's B block for classroom and bookstore space.

As part of Cariboo's application to become a university college in 1989, the first campus plan was developed with the requirement that every building have an official name. Without a single faculty or function to identify it, the 18-year-old Main or Main block building, as the oldest and most central building on campus, officially became Old Main when Cariboo College became the University College of the Cariboo.

Construction in the 1990s continued as the influx of undergraduate students kept growing. UCC doubled the size of the Library and Science buildings and opened the Computer Access Centre downtown on Victoria Street in 1991. The Arts and Education (A&E) building was built in two phases from 1991 to 1993. Beside A&E, the 53,000-square-foot Campus Activity Centre, which includes the campus bookstore, a cafeteria, pub, retail spaces, meeting rooms and the student union office and coffee shop, opened in 1993 thanks to a cost-recovery-based joint proposal between UCC and the student society. This was able to happen after a change in legislation in 1990 allowed the college to borrow money privately for development.

Also in 1993, UCC opened a new campus daycare facility, the Hillside Stadium track house, the Williams Lake campus extension, a regional centre in Ashcroft and the Wells Gray Education and Research Centre. The facilities at UCC, next door to the city's new Canada Games Pool, were integral to Kamloops hosting the 1993 Canada Summer Games. More regional centres opened in Merritt and Lillooet in 1994, and the Trades and Technology Centre was completed in 1997. The International Building opened in 2002 to house the growing international education department (now known as TRU World).

The Brown Family House of Learning building opened in 2011, housing TRU's library and a learning commons. It was the first TRU building to be awarded Leadership in Energy and Environmental Design (LEED) Gold status for sustainable construction. Its adjoining theatre-in-the-round has a ceiling made of pine-beetle-killed pine wood and a green roof in a design modelled after an Interior Salish pit house.

Old Main, the first building constructed on the Kamloops campus, was partly renovated and expanded in 2013 and it got a second phase of upgrades in 2021. The TRU Faculty of Law moved into the 44,000-square-foot addition in December 2013 and officially launched the space to coincide with convocation of its first graduating class in June 2014. The renovation won several awards, including an Honour Award of Excellence for 2014 from the Society of College and University Planning and the American Institute of Architects.

The Industrial Training and Technology Centre (ITTC) opened in September 2018 at a cost of $30 million. The 5,344-square-metre building positions the School of Trades and Technology and Faculty of Science to meet student and labour-market demand. There is space designed for new programs on campus, including industrial process technician, power engineering, HVAC/refrigeration technician, and machinist. The two-storey, state-of-the-art centre features classrooms, lab and shop areas, and it connects to the adjacent Trades and Technology building via a covered walkway. As some programs move from the Trades and Technology building to the ITTC, the Faculty of Science's Architectural and Engineering Technology (ARET) program takes its place in renovated spaces, leading to growth opportunities for ARET, including expansion to a fourth year. The changes made possible by the new building enable collaboration, applied research and training spanning the sciences and engineering disciplines.

The Chappell Family Building for Nursing and Population Health opened in 2020, with a total cost of $37.2 million. The Province of BC contributed $8 million. The building is a 4,550-square-metre facility encompassing classrooms, patient simulation labs, interdisciplinary health clinics, home-care space, student lounges and breakout rooms. It is a hub for health-care teaching and learning, and supports collaborative learning for interdisciplinary teams, bringing together students in respiratory therapy, social work and medical residency. It also fosters creativity and innovation, and support research designed to improve health outcomes.

Critical to student success are the building's patient simulation labs. Equipped with advanced technology, high-fidelity simulation manikins and space similar to that of real health-care settings, these labs will better prepare students for working conditions after graduation.

TRU Community Trust - The Reach 
TRU completed a Campus Master Plan in 2013, which set out future development of the Kamloops campus using a "university village" model. Aside from increasing density and enhancing campus life, the university village development will also provide a revenue stream that will raise money for scholarships, bursaries and research. A corporate trustee, TRU Community Trust (TRUCT), was created as a way for the development to progress but remain at arm's length from the university, which under current provincial post-secondary risk management policies, cannot directly control the project.

The project is known as The Reach. The goal is to develop 90 acres on campus in six phases with a total build out of 46,600 square feet of retail space, 40,000 square feet of office space and 3,500 residential units. Some of the residential projects have been completed, including Legacy Square by the Kelson Group and Creston House by the Cape Group.

Governance and academics 

TRU is a public post-secondary institution, funded by the Province of British Columbia through the Ministry of Advanced Education and Skills Training. As legislated by the province in the Thompson Rivers University Act, the purposes of the university are to offer baccalaureate and master's degree programs, to offer post-secondary and adult basic education and training, to undertake and maintain research and scholarly activities, and to provide an open learning educational credit bank for students. The university must promote teaching excellence and the use of open learning methods. In carrying out its purposes, the university must serve the educational and training needs in the region specified by the Lieutenant Governor in Council, and the open learning needs of British Columbia.

Governance at TRU is divided into three bodies responsible for corporate and academic decision-making, as legislated by the province in the University Act and the Thompson Rivers University Act. The Board of Governors is responsible for budgetary, operational and administrative matters. The Senate makes decisions on such academic matters as curriculum, credentials, admissions and educational policies. The Planning Council for Open Learning is similarly responsible for academic matters relating to the Open Learning Division. Provincial legislation mandates the composition, powers and duties of each governing body as well as the degree-granting powers of the university. Individual degree programs are approved by the Ministry of Advanced Education and Skills Training.

The University Act also legislates the leadership of the university, including the powers, duties and offices of the president. The president holds the offices of vice-chancellor, member of the Board of Governors and chair of the Senate. The president and vice-chancellor is the chief executive officer, responsible to the Board and Senate for the supervision of TRU's administrative and academic work. Advising and reporting to the president are the provost and vice-president academic, the vice-president administration and finance, the vice-president university relations, the vice-president international, the vice-president research, the associate vice-president marketing and communications, and the executive director Indigenous education.

TRU offers 140 on-campus programs, and about 60 distance or online programs through its Open Learning Division, in the following faculties and schools:

 Faculty of Adventure, Culinary Arts and Tourism
 Faculty of Arts
 Bob Gaglardi School of Business and Economics
 Faculty of Education and Social Work
 Faculty of Law
 School of Nursing
 Faculty of Science
 Faculty of Student Development
 School of Trades and Technology

TRU also has two divisions: Open Learning, offering distance, online and blended learning options to students in all faculties and schools; and TRU World, serving international and study abroad students.

See also
List of universities in British Columbia
Higher education in British Columbia
Education in Canada
Canadian university scientific research organizations
Open Learning Institute of British Columbia
Open Learning Agency

References

External links

Thompson Rivers University
Thompson Rivers University, Open Learning
TRU World
Thompson Rivers University Students Union
TRU Athletics

 
1970 establishments in British Columbia
Educational institutions established in 1970
Universities in British Columbia
Distance education institutions based in Canada